Vanoise National Park is a French national park between the Tarentaise and Maurienne valleys in the French Alps, containing the Vanoise massif. It was created in 1963 as the first national park in France.

Vanoise National Park is in the département of Savoie. Small villages like Champagny-le-Haut, Termignon, La Chiserette, Bramans, Sollières-Sardières, Friburge, Pralognan-la-Vanoise and Séez, lie near the park. The park is bordered by several large French ski resorts (Les Trois Vallées, Tignes, Val-d'Isère, Les Arcs, La Plagne).

On the Italian side of the border, the park is continued by Gran Paradiso National Park. Together, these two parks cover over 1250 km2, making the area the largest alpine national park.

Wildlife
The park is well known for its population of Alpine ibex (Capra ibex), bouquetin in French, which is its emblem. 
The alpine chamois, like the ibex, spend most of the year above the tree line. They descend the snow line in early spring and late fall to enjoy the grass uncovered by the ice and snow.
Alpine marmot, wolf, Eurasian lynx, mountain hare, Eurasian badger, ermine and weasel are the other mammals commonly present in Vanoise.

There are more than 100 bird species in the protected area. Birds of prey include bearded vulture, golden eagle and Eurasian eagle-owl. Other birds found in the park are black woodpeckers, rock ptarmigans, Alpine accentors, nutcrackers, choughs and black grouses.
The wallcreeper is found on steep cliffs especially for nesting.

See also
 Vanoise Massif

External links

 

National parks of France
Geography of Savoie
Protected areas established in 1963
Tourist attractions in Savoie
Protected areas of the Alps